Ji Ben (died 218) was an imperial physician who lived during the late Eastern Han dynasty of China. In 218, he started a rebellion with several others in the imperial capital, Xu (許; present-day Xuchang, Henan), but the revolt was suppressed and the conspirators were captured and executed.

Error in name
Ji Ben's given name was actually "Pi". His name is believed to have been erroneously recorded as "Ben" in historical texts to avoid naming taboo, because "Pi" was the personal name of Cao Pi, the first ruler of the Cao Wei state. Besides, the Chinese character for "Pi" might have actually been 㔻 instead of 丕. There were instances where 㔻 had been mistakenly written as 丕.

Life
Ji Ben served as a court physician (太醫令) in the imperial court of the Eastern Han dynasty during the reign of Emperor Xian. Around the time, the Han central government had fallen under the control of Cao Cao, the Imperial Chancellor. Emperor Xian was merely a figurehead ruler. In 216, Emperor Xian granted Cao Cao the title of a vassal king – King of Wei (魏王) – and allowed him to establish a vassal kingdom in northern China which was still nominally under the Han administration.

In late 217 or early 218, Ji Ben plotted a rebellion in the imperial capital, Xu (許; present-day Xuchang, Henan), together with several others, including: Geng Ji, a Minister Steward; Wei Huang, a Director of Justice; Jin Yi; his sons Ji Miao (吉邈; courtesy name Wenran and Ji Mu (吉穆; courtesy name Siran. Their plan was to kill Wang Bi, a Chief Clerk serving under Cao Cao, after which they would take Emperor Xian hostage, attack Cao Cao's vassal kingdom, and render assistance to Cao's rival Liu Bei, a warlord who controlled parts of southern and western China. Around the time, Liu Bei's general Guan Yu was achieving success at the Battle of Fancheng against Cao Cao's general Cao Ren, while Cao Cao himself was away in Ye (in present-day Handan, Hebei) and had left Wang Bi in charge of Xu.

Ji Miao led the Ji family's retainers and other supporters, numbering about 1,000 people, to attack Wang Bi's camp at night and set fire to the gate. Jin Yi was very trusted by Wang Bi, so he used the opportunity to plant spies in Wang's camp before the revolt started. Wang Bi was injured in the arm by an arrow during the attack. As he was unaware of the true identities of the rebels, he escaped from the camp and sought shelter in Jin Yi's house, not knowing that Jin was actually one of the conspirators. Jin Yi's servants did not recognise Wang Bi and thought that he was Ji Miao, so they replied, "Is Chief Clerk Wang dead? Your plan has succeeded!" Wang Bi then left and headed to the south of Xu. With assistance from Yan Kuang, an Agriculture General of the Household, Wang Bi succeeded in suppressing the revolt when he led troops back to his camp to attack the rebels and defeated them. Ji Ben and the conspirators were all captured and executed for treason. Wang Bi died from his wounds several days later.

In Romance of the Three Kingdoms
Ji Ben is a minor character in Chapter 23 of the 14th-century historical novel Romance of the Three Kingdoms, which romanticises the events before and during the Three Kingdoms period. In the novel, Ji Ben is renamed Ji Tai with the courtesy name Ping, hence he is referred to as Ji Ping. He serves as a physician in the Han imperial court. Around 199, Ji Ping gets involved in a plot masterminded by Dong Cheng, Liu Bei and others to assassinate Cao Cao. They have the tacit support of Emperor Xian, who had issued a secret imperial decree written in blood to Dong Cheng ordering him to get rid of Cao Cao. Cao Cao experiences chronic headaches and requires constant medical treatment, so Ji Ping thinks of adding poison to Cao Cao's medicine. However, Dong Cheng is betrayed by his servant Qin Qingtong, who reports his master's plan to Cao Cao. Ji Ping is arrested when he comes to serve medicine to Cao Cao and then severely tortured to force him to confess. Cao Cao even orders Ji Ping to be tortured in the presence of Dong Cheng and the others (excluding Liu Bei, who had already left the capital), who eventually admit to their roles in the assassination plot. Cao Cao has all of them arrested and executed along with their families.

See also
 Lists of people of the Three Kingdoms

Notes

References

 Chen, Shou (3rd century). Records of the Three Kingdoms (Sanguozhi).
 Luo, Guanzhong (14th century). Romance of the Three Kingdoms (Sanguo Yanyi).
 Pei, Songzhi (5th century). Annotations to Records of the Three Kingdoms (Sanguozhi zhu).

Year of birth unknown
218 deaths
Cao Cao and associates
3rd-century Chinese physicians
People executed by the Han dynasty
Executed Han dynasty people
People from Xianyang
Executed people from Shaanxi
Physicians from Shaanxi